Spilarctia mastrigti is a moth in the family Erebidae. It was described by Rob de Vos and Daawia Suhartawan in 2011. It is found in Papua and Papua New Guinea.

Adults have a variable ground colour. The pattern on the forewings of the males is mostly sooty brown with brown sinuous transverse lines, although there are pale specimens.

References

Moths described in 2011
mastrigti